A Mesophotic coral reef or mesophotic coral ecosystem (MCE), originally from the Latin word meso (meaning middle) and photic (meaning light), is characterised by the presence of both light-dependent coral and algae, and organisms that can be found in water with low light penetration. Mesophotic Coral Ecosystem (MCEs) is a new, widely-adopted term used to refer to mesophotic coral reefs, as opposed to other similar terms like "deep coral reef communities" and "twilight zone", since those terms sometimes are confused due to their unclear, interchangeable nature.

The most common species at the mesophotic level are corals, sponges and algae. The corals ranges can overlap with Deep-water coral but are distinguished by the presence of zooxanthellae and their requirement for light. They can also be thought of as part of shallow water coral ecosystems, and a crossover of coral species between the two is common. It is thought that these corals could be used as sources for reseeding shallow water coral species, but recent analyses show that mesophotic ecosystems are more unique that previously thought and also threatened. The oldest known mesophotic coral ecosystems have been described from the Silurian of Sweden, such ecosystems are also known from Devonian. Oldest scleractinian-dominated mesophotic ecosystems are known from the Triassic.

Ecosystem services

MCEs has ecosystem services that associated with shallow water coral reef. These ecosystem services include: habitat economically and ecologically for important species, potential for tourism and recovery to shallow population, discovery new essential substances and coastal protection. MCEs provide essential shelter for threaten and overexploitation species that allows species to grow, maintain diversity and support key ecological function. As a result MCEs can help shallow reef recovery by provide juveniles to shallow areas. MCEs play important role to maintain fish production as most of economic fish are deep generalist and spawn between 30-110m depth. In Pulley Ridge, Red snappers building their nest at 60-80m depth and it provide larvae to shallow reefs, such as Florida Keys.

Threats

Mesophotic reefs have the same threats as shallow reefs, such as bleaching events and intense storms, but are less exposed to them than shallow reefs. Furthermore, by virtue of their depth and their remote offshore location, mesophotic reefs have better protection from direct human impact such as nutrient run-off and overfishing. Overexploitation from fisheries in shallow areas may lead to the perturbation of trophic level in deeper reefs. In addition bottom landings gear usage  can cause physical damage to the reefs and stir up sediment that smother and kill coral. Climate change is a global threat to all coral reef ecosystem including mesophotic reefs. It causes the increase in sea surface temperature through the green house effect, ocean acidification and variability of temperature that involves in fluctuation of La Nina and El Nino. Other concerns are oil and gas exploration and cable and pipeline laying.

Anthropogenic disturbances affecting MCEs 
MCEs are vulnerable to global and local anthropogenic disturbances. It has been suggested that MCEs may be refugia from many global and localized anthropogenic impacts. This buffering has both a depth and distance from shore component. Further, as human pressure on coral reefs increase, MCEs will be subject to more disturbances. The timing of increased disturbance will likely vary depending on ocean basin and the regional rates of warming, ocean acidification, and local human population growth. This human disruption is divided into several classification:

Global Warming and Thermal Stress 
Periods of anomalously high temperatures during the warmest part of the year can stimulate coral bleaching and mass mortalities and are considered one of the greatest existential threats to shallow-water coral reef ecosystems. For MCEs that are exposed to the UML during warm water temperature periods, their fate may be linked directly to shallow-water reefs. Since shallow- water corals and MCEs in this situation share similar temperature profiles, their thermal tolerance limits (bleaching thresholds) may be similar.

Ocean acidification 
Ocean acidification (OA) is a particularly broad threat facing all coral reef ecosystems. Research has not yet evaluated the specific effects on MCEs and hermatypic scleractinian corals. If similar to shallow-water reefs, as a result of OA, MCEs could see reductions in net community calcification, reductions in coral growth, and likely shifts to algae-dominated systems with a few resistant scleractinian taxa.

Pollution 
Pollution from land and marine sources can directly and indirectly impact MCEs and cause disturbances. Sewage, toxins, and marine debris can be pumped or dumped directly into the marine environment or arrive as components of runoff from land.

Sedimentation 
Despite distance away from human activities, many MCEs are impacted naturally and anthropogenically by sedimentation, i.e., the deposition of sediments from the water column onto benthic surfaces. Sedimentation rates are artificially increased in the marine environment by a variety of means, including runoff from land, dredge dumping, and alterations to water flow that change natural sedimentation patterns. While sediment burial from any source can be detrimental to living coral tissue, terrigenous sediments have been found to be particularly harmful.

Turbidity and light penetration 
MCEs are generally light-limited systems  and, thus, may be extremely vulnerable to reductions in light as a consequence of increased turbidity or rising sea level. At the deepest extent of their ranges, many stony coral species may be near their lower light limit, although many MCEs exhibit adaptations for efficient light capture. Human activities that increase water column turbidity include sediment runoff and dredge dumping (suspended sediment) and increased nutrient pollution that increases the abundance of phytoplankton and zooplankton. Long periods where light penetration is decreased (higher attenuation coefficients) could lead to light limitation of phototrophic corals, with concomitant partial bleaching and mortality.

Benthic infrastructure 
Industrial infrastructure that is laid across the seafloor or built upon the seafloor could impact MCEs. In particular, cables and pipes used for energy, material, and data transfer are employed worldwide and in areas with MCEs. The initial emplacement and settling of cables could directly damage and kill habitat-forming corals and other sessile organisms, and maintenance activities where the cables are retrieved and replaced on the bottom could further these impacts. However, once settled and secure on the seafloor, cables can become part of the reef structure and are colonized by sessile organisms.

Mechanical disturbance 
There is a great potential for MCEs to be damaged by mechanical disturbance, which causes the physical displacement and movement of corals. Since MCEs are under-described, their presence is poorly known to society, and activities such as anchoring in mesophotic depths may be considered non-detrimental. At the same time, many plating colony morphologies particularly common in MCEs are susceptible to breakage. Fishing gear (e.g., nets, traps, and lines) are commonly entangled and abandoned in MCEs.

Fishing and collection 
Organisms can be removed by fishing for consumption, collection for the aquarium, medicinal, and curio trade, and inadvertent loss or out-migration from other activities or factors, such as introductions of predators and incidence of disease. Thus, removal for one organism, especially who play an important role in MCEs, put those environmental into any further risk.

Diseases 
MCEs are not immune to disease disturbances. Stony corals are susceptible to diseases that appear to be increasing in frequency and impact on community structure. Some coral diseases are also showing the ability to transmit between colonies through direct contact and waterborne transmission. While disease can reflect the signs of coral death due to environmental causes, the ability of disease to transmit between colonies and undergo outbreaks of high prevalence at the colony level indicates disease is a multiplier of environmental stress and disturbance.

Invasive species 
Invasive species that are introduced to a novel biogeographic range or are native but released by ecological forces have been demonstrated to act as a disturbance in MCEs. Introduced or invasive sessile organisms can also reside in and impact MCEs. For example, algae of the genus Ramicrusta (Peyssonneliaceae) have recently appeared in the Caribbean where they were absent or rare and have become successful space competitors. The algae are able to overtop edges of living stony corals and other benthic organisms, causing death of underlying tissue.

See also
 Photic zone

References

External links
http://www.mesophotic.org/ - Database of scientific publications on mesophotic environments

Coral reefs